Felleng Mamakeka Makeka is a diplomat for Lesotho.

Makeka was Lesotho's diplomat to the United Kingdom from 2013 to 2015, as High Commissioner for the Kingdom of Lesotho.

References

Living people
High Commissioners of Lesotho to the United Kingdom
Year of birth missing (living people)
Place of birth missing (living people)